, also written as (33340) 1998 VG44, is a trans-Neptunian object. It has a 2:3 orbital resonance with the planet Neptune, similar to Pluto, classifying it as a plutino. Its average distance from the Sun is 39.083 AU with a perihelion of 29.354 AU and an aphelion at 48.813 AU. Its orbit has an eccentricity of 0.249, and is inclined by 3°. It is about 221 km in diameter, so it is unlikely to be classified as a dwarf planet. It was discovered on November 14, 1998, by J. A. Larsen, Nicole M. Danzl and A. Gleason at the Steward Observatory.

References 

 List of Trans Neptunian Objects, Minor Planet Center
 http://www.johnstonsarchive.net/astro/tnoslist.html
 https://newton.spacedys.com/cgi-bin/astdys/astibo?objects:1998VG44;main
 http://asteroid.lowell.edu/

External links
 

033340
19981114
Discoveries by Nichole M. Danzl
Discoveries by Arianna E. Gleason